Carll Goodpasture (born 1943) is an American cytogenetics expert, entomologist, and photographer. 
He has written many books and has also been a contributor on others with his photographs.
He is constantly working in his Norwegian Shore project. He is also well known for his pinhole camera photos.
He married Norwegian Gro Heining (artist) in 1987.

Education

He studied photography and cinematography, California State University Los Angeles, 1969.
He received his MS in 1971 and Ph.D. in 1974 in Entomology at University of California Davis.
He did post-doctoral work in Molecular and Cell Biology at the University of Houston, Texas, 1975.
And further post-doctoral work in Cell Biology at City of Hope National Medical Center, 1976.

Solo exhibitions

Smithsonian National Museum of Natural History, Washington D.C., 1980
Creative Arts Center, Fargo North Dakota, 1980, 1981
City of Hope National Medical Center, Duarte, CA., 1982
Oslo Botanical Garden, 1998
Jeløy Naturhus, Norway, 1998
Agder Naturmuseum og Botanisk Hage, Norway, 1998
Norges Landbrukshøgskole, Norway, 1998
National Zoological Park, Washington D.C. 2000
Fotografiens hus, Norway, Oct. 26 - Nov. 15, 2000 "A long time to see"
Smithsonian Institution Traveling Exhibition Service, 2001–2005 (including site installations at Selby Botanical Gardens, Sarasota FL., Chicago Botanic Garden, Chicago IL., Houston Museum of Natural History, Houston TX., etc.)
Atelier Ogna Art Gallery, Norway, 2003
Naturfotofestivalen i Vennesla, March 2005
Teie Kunstgalleri - Lillemor Nerdrum, Nov.5 - 26, 2005
Galleri Vera July 8–31, 2006
Kommunegården Sandvika - Bærum Nov. 4, 2006
Vadsø gjesteatelier, July 2007
Fotografiens hus, Norway, Jan. 10 - Feb. 3, 2013. "Where are we now?"

Grants and awards

North Dakota Council On The Arts, 1981
United States Department of Agriculture Travel Award, 1984
Norwegian Professional Photographer's Found, 1997, 1999, 2002
Norwegian Ministry of the Environment, 1998
Norwegian Ministry of Foreign Affairs, 1999, 2002
Thomas K. and Katherine Reed Charitable Fund, Santa Fe, NM., 2000
Kittredge Fund for Artists and Scholars, Cleveland, OH., 2000
The 63rd International Photographic Salon of Japan, 2003
Finnmark kommune Artist in Residence, July 2007

Institutional representation

Smithsonian Institution
Northern New Mexico Community College
Oslo Botanical Garden (Norway)
Oslo Fotokunstskole (Norway)
Det Norske Veritas (Norway)
Kunst på Arbeidsplassen (Norway)
Gjensidige Nor (Norway)
Norsk museum for fotografi, Preus fotomuseum (Norway)
Finnmark Kommune (Norway)

Gallery representation

Atelier Ogna Art Gallery, Sirevåg, Norway
Kunst i Skolen, Oslo, Norway
Galleri D40, Oslo, Norway

References

External links
Official website 
Carll Goodpasture on Facebook 
Carll Goodpasture in the bookstore 

lesPHOTOGRAPHERS.com 
Østlandets blad 

American photographers
Living people
1943 births
California State University, Los Angeles alumni
University of California, Davis alumni
University of Houston alumni